Kirchbach-Zerlach is since 2015 a municipality with 3,271 residents (as of 1 January 2016) in the Südoststeiermark District of Styria, Austria. In 2015 the municipality was called Kirchbach in der Steiermark.

The municipality of Kirchbach-Zerlach was formed as part of the Styria municipal structural reform, at the end of 2014, from the former towns of Kirchbach in Steiermark and Zerlach.

After a municipal council agreement, from 1 January 2016, the municipality bears the name "Kirchbach-Zerlach".

Geography

Municipalities arrangement 
The municipality territory includes the following 12 sections (populations as of 1 January 2015) and three cadastral communities (area 2015):
Ortschaften

 Breitenbuch (410)
 Dörfla (458)
 Glatzau (229)
 Kirchbach in Steiermark (853)
 Kittenbach (84)
 Kleinfrannach (180)
 Maierhofen (119)
 Maxendorf (190)
 Tagensdorf (19)
 Weißenbach (160)
 Zerlach (375)
 Ziprein (158)

Katastralgemeinden

 Kirchbach in Steiermark (903.30 ha)
 Zerlach (2,381.82 ha)
 Ziprein (630.10 ha)

Demographics 
The area population has generally increased after 1869, as shown in the bar graph below.

Culture and sights

Politics

Mayor 
The town mayor is Franz Löffler (ÖVP).

Further of the council, the 1st vice-mayor Anton Prödl (ÖVP), the 2nd vice-mayor Karl Süßmaier (Liste "Gemeinsam mehr bewegen"), the town treasurer Thomas Zach (ÖVP), and the  board member Josef Luttenberger (ÖVP).

Municipal council 
The town council in 2015 had 21 members (prior 30 = 15 in Kirchbach + 15 in Zerlach) and convened with the following parties:
 15 ÖVP
 3 Liste "Gemeinsam mehr bewegen"
 2 SPÖ
 1 FPÖ

The last town election had the following results:

 x = not candidate

References

External links 

 - collection of images, videos and audio files
 Gemeinde Kirchbach-Zerlach: Offizieller Internetauftritt der Gemeinde

Cities and towns in Südoststeiermark District